Robert Edward Schwartz (January 14, 1919 – June 3, 1995) was an American professional basketball player. He played for the Sheboygan Red Skins in the National Basketball League in 1942–43 and averaged 5.6 points per game. He won an NBL championship with the Red Skins in his only season with the team.

References

1919 births
1995 deaths
American men's basketball players
Basketball players from Wisconsin
Forwards (basketball)
Sheboygan Red Skins players
Sportspeople from Madison, Wisconsin
Wisconsin Badgers men's basketball players